The Caproni Ca.134 was a biplane reconnaissance aircraft built by the Italian company Caproni in the 1930s.

Design
The Ca.134 was a conventional-looking, single-biplane, two-seater fixed-cart aircraft. The fuselage, made of a metal structure covered with panels that were also metal, incorporated the two tandem cabins with windshield, the front for the pilot and the rear of the observer, the latter equipped with side windows to facilitate the location targets and a defensive brandable machine gun. Laterally it continued in a tail characterized by the biplane bi-fletching drift with double control planes from the accentuated positive dihedral angle.  The wing configuration was inverted biplane-sesquiplane, with the upper wing opening lower than the one mounted low on the fuselage. The two wings were connected to each other by an N- shaped mullion on each side integrated with steel wire tie -rods, with the upper connected to the fuselage by a central tubular castle. 
The landing gear was a simple two- wheeled cycle with shock-absorbed power legs fitted with a "trouser" fairing, integrated at the back by a small wheel. 
The propulsion was entrusted to an Isotta Fraschini Asso XI RC.40 engine positioned at the front apex of the fuselage, a liquid-cooled 12-cylinder V engine capable of delivering a power output of 900 hp (662 kW ), covered by a metal casing and combined with a triple helix.

The armament consisted of a pair of Breda-SAFAT machine guns of different caliber, the heaviest 12.7 mm mounted on the hunt and the lighter 7.7 mm mounted on a tilting support and positioned in the rear passenger compartment.

Development
In 1936 the Ministry of Aeronautics issued a specification for the supply of a new terrestrial strategic reconnaissance aircraft. The Caproni also participated in the competition announcement with a design assigned to the designation Ca.134. The Ca.134 was evaluated in Guidonia on January 23, 1937 by the commission examining the Regia Aeronautica but did not get any commission. There is no certain information about the use that was made but it appears to have been permanently put on the ground on 11 May 1939, radiated by age.

Specifications

Notes

References
 
 

Ca.134
1930s Italian military reconnaissance aircraft
Single-engined tractor aircraft
High-wing aircraft
Aircraft first flown in 1937